Bolusiella is a genus of flowering plants from the orchid family, Orchidaceae. It consists of 4 currently recognized species that are endemic to sub-Saharan Africa and the Comoro Islands.

Bolusiella are often very small, no more than a few centimeters tall. They exhibit monopodial growth.

Species and subspecies
The following are accepted as of May 2014:

 Bolusiella fractiflexa Droissart, Stévart & Verlynde - Cameroon, Rwanda to Burundi
 Bolusiella iridifolia (Rolfe) Schltr.
Bolusiella iridifolia subsp. iridifolia - from Ivory Coast east to Ethiopia and Tanzania, south to Angola and Zimbabwe; also Comoros
Bolusiella iridifolia subsp. picea P.J.Cribb - from Burundi and Kenya south to Zimbabwe
 Bolusiella maudiae (Bolus) Schltr. - from Ivory Coast east to Tanzania, south to KwaZulu-Natal
 Bolusiella talbotii (Rendle) Summerh. in J.Hutchinson & J.M.Dalziel - from Sierra Leone to Tanzania
 Bolusiella zenkeri (Kraenzl.) Schltr. - from Ivory Coast east to Gabon

See also 
 List of Orchidaceae genera

References 

 Pridgeon, A.M., Cribb, P.J., Chase, M.A. & Rasmussen, F. eds. (1999). Genera Orchidacearum 1. Oxford Univ. Press.
 Pridgeon, A.M., Cribb, P.J., Chase, M.A. & Rasmussen, F. eds. (2001). Genera Orchidacearum 2. Oxford Univ. Press.
 Pridgeon, A.M., Cribb, P.J., Chase, M.A. & Rasmussen, F. eds. (2003). Genera Orchidacearum 3. Oxford Univ. Press
 Berg Pana, H. 2005. Handbuch der Orchideen-Namen. Dictionary of Orchid Names. Dizionario dei nomi delle orchidee. Ulmer, Stuttgart

External links 
 

Vandeae genera
Orchids of Africa
Flora of the Comoros
Angraecinae